T.61 is an ITU-T Recommendation for a Teletex character set.  T.61 predated Unicode,
and was the primary character set in ASN.1 used in early versions of X.500 and X.509
for encoding strings containing characters used in Western European languages. It is also used by older versions of LDAP. While T.61 continues to be supported in modern versions of X.500 and X.509, it has been deprecated in favor of Unicode. It is also called Code page 1036, CP1036, or IBM 01036.

While ASN.1 does see wide use and the T.61 character set is used on some standards using ASN.1 (for example in RSA Security's PKCS #9), the 1988-11 version of the T.61 standard itself was superseded by a never-published 1993-03 version; the 1993-03 version was withdrawn by the ITU-T.  The 1988-11 version is still available.

Code page layout 

The following table maps the T.61 characters to their equivalent Unicode code points.

See ITU T.51 for a description of how the accents at 0xC0..CF worked. They prefix the letters, as opposed to postfix used by Unicode.

See also 
 ITU T.51

Footnotes

References

External links 
 ITU-T Recommendation T.61 at ITU-T
 ISO-IR-103 (ISO-IR registration of right-hand part)

Character sets
ASN.1
T.61
T.61